Sylte or Valldal is a village in Fjord Municipality in Møre og Romsdal county, Norway. The village is situated at the southern end of the Valldalen valley along the shore of the Norddalsfjorden near the mouth of the Valldøla river, just west of the entrance to the Tafjorden. The  village has a population (2012) of 411.

Norwegian County Road 63 runs north through Sylte on its way through the Valldalen valley up to the Trollstigen area.

The village is home to many industries, including production of cement and wood products, fish farming, and tourism. The newspaper Storfjordnytt is published in Sylte. Sylte Church is located here. The name originates from an older word in dialect meaning wet lowland.

The village was the administrative center of the old Norddal Municipality until 2020.

References

External links

Fjord (municipality)
Villages in Møre og Romsdal